Raiders of the Lost Ark is an action-adventure game created for the Atari 2600 based on the movie of the same name (the first installment of the Indiana Jones series). The game was designed by Howard Scott Warshaw.

Gameplay 

The player controls Indiana Jones as he searches for the lost Ark of the Covenant. The game requires the player to use two different controllers: controller 2 moves Jones and its button uses an item; controller 1 selects the item to use and its button drops the item.

The video game is set in the city of Cairo in 1936, represented by an entrance room and a marketplace. From the entrance room, the player can blast a hole in the wall with a grenade and enter the Temple of the Ancients. Two paths await inside the Temple, both of which contain various dangers, after which the player will at last find the treasure room. Gold and artifacts can be picked up in the treasure room which will help the player later in the game.

The player must cross a mesa, on the other side of which lies the Map Room where the location of the Lost Ark is revealed. South of the Map Room is a Thieves Den and a Black Market. The Black Market contains various figures, such as two sheikhs, a Tsetse fly and a lunatic, and items needed to win the game (most notably a shovel).

After acquiring all needed items from the various rooms, the player returns to the mesa and jumps off using a parachute. The player goes inside the mesa, via a small hole at the end of a branch, and digs up the Ark, after dodging more thieves.

Development
The game began development in late 1981. Warshaw said in an interview: "I had a 10-foot bullwhip that I got while doing Raiders of the Lost Ark, so I could get into character. When I'd take breaks, I'd go around the hallways, sneak up behind people and crack the whip. It was really loud. Like a gunshot".

The packaging, manual, and advertising artwork was painted by Atari art director James Kelly.

Reception
Richard A. Edwards reviewed Raiders of the Lost Ark in The Space Gamer No. 61. Edwards commented that "though the graphics are not great (but they are fairly good) and the Raiders of the Lost Ark theme song has a note or two off-key, this is still the adventure cartridge of the year. Those gamers who prefer magic items, puzzles, and thoughtful play mixed with arcade movement should find Raiders well worth the price".

Video Games in 1983 called Raiders of the Lost Ark "a more complex adventure game" than E.T., released a month later. The magazine noted that the documentation was incomplete and advised players to experiment with multiple ways to progress. Electronic Games stated that the game "doesn't quite live up to its inspiration ... does not excel in excitement", and was inferior to Pitfall!, which was also released in 1982.

The game sold less than a million copies.

References

External links 
 Raiders of the Lost Ark at Atari Mania 
 Raiders of the Lost Ark at AtariAge
 Raiders of the Lost Ark manual at the Internet Archive
 Brief mention of Raiders on Howard Scott Warshaw's web page

1982 video games
Action-adventure games
Atari games
Atari 2600 games
Atari 2600-only games
Indiana Jones video games
Video game sequels

Video games set in Egypt
Video games developed in the United States
Video games designed by Howard Scott Warshaw